Shota Grigalashvili (born 21 June 1986) is a Georgian former footballer who played as a midfielder. He is the older brother of Elgujja, also footballer.

Career

Club
In 2007, Grigalashvili had a trial with German side FC Erzgebirge Aue, together with his fellow country-man Beka Gotsiridze. They were recommended by Klaus Toppmöller, then the national coach of Georgia. Both failed to impress.

On 24 June 2016, Grigalashvili signed for Kazakhstan Premier League side FC Irtysh Pavlodar. In January 2018, Grigalashvili returned to Kazakhstan, signing for FC Kyzylzhar.

International
Grigalashvili has been capped 12 times so far for his country, whilst also playing for the under-21 team.

References

External links

1986 births
Living people
Footballers from Georgia (country)
Georgia (country) international footballers
Georgia (country) under-21 international footballers
Association football midfielders
Erovnuli Liga players
Russian Premier League players
Cypriot First Division players
Kazakhstan Premier League players
FC Dinamo Tbilisi players
FC Meskheti Akhaltsikhe players
FC Borjomi players
FC Zestafoni players
Expatriate footballers from Georgia (country)
FC Spartak Vladikavkaz players
Expatriate footballers in Russia
Expatriate footballers in Cyprus
Expatriate footballers in Kazakhstan
Anorthosis Famagusta F.C. players
FC SKA-Khabarovsk players
AC Omonia players
Nea Salamis Famagusta FC players
FC Irtysh Pavlodar players